The  is one of the constituent companies of the Japan Railways Group (JR Group), and is often referred to using its official abbreviation of . It operates intercity and local rail services in Hokkaido, Japan. The company introduced Kitaca, a smart card ticketing system, in autumn 2008.

At the time of its privatization in 1987, JR Hokkaido operated 21 railway lines totalling  of narrow-gauge track, as well as a ferry service to Aomori. Since then, that figure has dwindled to just below , as unprofitable lines have been shut down or spun off (in the case of the Hokkaidō Chihoku Kōgen Railway). The ferry service has also been replaced by the Seikan Tunnel.

On 19 November 2016, JR Hokkaido's president announced plans to further rationalize its network by the withdrawal of services from up to 1,237 km, or about 50% of the current network, including closure of the remaining section of the Rumoi Main Line (the Rumoi - Mashike section closed on 4 December 2016), the Shin-Yubari - Yubari section of the Sekisho Line (closed on 1 April 2019), the non-electrified section of the Sassho Line (closed 17 April 2020) and the Nemuro Line between Furano and Shintoku. Other lines including the Sekihoku Main Line, Senmo Main Line, the Nayoro - Wakkanai section of the Soya Line and Kushiro - Nemuro section of the Nemuro Line are proposed for conversion to Third Sector operation, but if local governments are not agreeable, such sections will also face closure. JR Hokkaido closed 25 stations from March 2021 to March 2022 due to a decrease in passengers.
 
JR Hokkaido's headquarters are in Chūō-ku, Sapporo.

History 
 1 April 1987: Upon the privatization of the Japanese National Railways (JNR), the Hokkaido Railway Company was formed
 25 October 2008: Kitaca contactless smart card introduced in Sapporo area

Headquarters and branch offices 

 Headquarters: 1-1-15 Kita-11-jō-Nishi, Chūō-ku, Sapporo
 Branch offices:
  Asahikawa branch office: 6-4152-2 Miyashita-dōri, Asahikawa
  Hakodate branch office: 12-5 Wakamatsu-chō, Hakodate
  Kushiro branch office: 5-14 Kita-ōdōri, Kushiro

Lines and key stations

Shinkansen
Hokkaido Shinkansen:
 -  148.9 km (92.5 mi)

Trunk lines 
Chitose Line:
 -  60.2 km (37.1 mi)
 -  2.6 km (1.6 mi)
Hakodate Main Line()
  -  -  -  -  423.1 km (262.9 mi)
 -  -  35.3 km (21.9 mi)
Muroran Main Line
 -  -  -  211.0 km (131.1 mi)
Higashi-Muroran - Muroran 7.0 km (4.4 mi)
Nemuro Main Line
 -  -  443.8 km (275.8 mi)
Sekishō Line
Minami-Chitose -  132.4 km (82.3 mi)

Other lines 

Furano Line
 - Asahikawa 54.8 km (34.1 mi)
Hidaka Main Line
 -  30.5 km (19.0 mi)
Sekihoku Main Line
 -  -  234.0 km (145.4 mi)
Rumoi Main Line
 -  50.1 km (31.1 mi)
Sasshō Line
 -  28.9 km (18.0 mi)
Senmō Main Line
 -  166.2 km (103.3 mi)
Sōya Main Line
Asahikawa -  -  259.4 km (161.2 mi)

Under construction
 Hokkaido Shinkansen 
 -  211.3 km (131.3 mi) scheduled to open in 2031

Former lines
Chihoku Line
 -  140.0 km (87.0 mi) transferred to Hokkaidō Chihoku Kōgen Railway Company on June 4, 1989, then closed on April 21, 2006
Esashi Line
 -  37.8 km (23.5 mi) transferred to South Hokkaido Railway Company on March 26, 2016
Kikonai -  42.1 km (26.2 mi) closed on May 12, 2014
Hakodate Main Line branch
 -  7.3 km (4.5 mi) closed on May 16, 1994	
Horonai Line
 -  18.1 km (11.2 mi) and  -  2.7 km (1.7 mi) closed on July 13, 1987
Matsumae Line
 -  50.8 km (31.6 mi) closed on February 1, 1988
Nayoro Main Line
 -  138.1 (85.8 mi) and  -  4.9 km (3.0 mi) closed on May 1, 1989
Rumoi Main Line
 -  16.7 km (10.4 mi) closed on December 4, 2016
Shibetsu Line
 -  69.4 km (43.1 mi) and  -  47.5 km (29.5 mi) closed on April 30, 1989
Shinmei Line
 -  121.8 km (75.7 mi) closed on September 4, 1995
Tempoku Line
 -  148.9 km (92.5 mi) closed on May 1, 1989
Utashinai Line
 -  14.5 km (9.0 mi) closed on April 25, 1988
Sekishō Line
Yūbari - Shin-Yūbari 16.1 km (10.0 mi) closed on March 31, 2019
Sasshō Line
 -  47.6 km (29.6 mi) closed on April 17, 2020,

The company also operated the Seikan Ferry until 1988.

Former JNR lines closed before JR Hokkaido formation 
These lines have been closed by JNR in Hokkaido before April 1, 1987.
Aioi Line
 -  36.8 km (22.9 mi) closed on April 1, 1985
Bikō Line
 -  21.2 km (13.2 mi) closed on September 17, 1985
Haboro Line
 -  141.1 km (87.7 mi) closed on March 30, 1987
Hiroo Line
 -  84.0 km (52.2 mi) closed on February 2, 1987
Iburi Line
 -  83.0 km (51.6 mi) and  -  7.5 km (4.7 mi) closed on November 11, 1986
Iwanai Line
 -  14.9 km (9.3 mi) closed on September 1, 1985
Kōhin'hoku Line
 -  30.4 km (18.9 mi) closed on July 1, 1985
Kōhin'nan Line
 -  19.9 km (12.4 mi) closed on July 15, 1985
Konpoku Line
 -  12.8 km (8.0 mi) closed on December 1, 1970
Manji Line
 -  23.8 km (14.8 mi) closed on April 1, 1985
Setana Line
 -  48.4 km (30.1 mi) closed on March 16, 1987
Shihoro Line
 -  78.3 km (48.7 mi) closed on March 23, 1987
Shiranuka Line
 -  33.1 km (20.6 mi) closed on October 23, 1983
Shokotsu Line
 -  34.3 km (21.3 mi) closed on April 1, 1985
Temiya Line
 -  2.8 km (1.7 mi) closed on November 5, 1985
Tomiuchi Line
 -  82.5 km (51.3 mi) closed on November 1, 1986
Yūmō Line
 -  121.8 km (75.7 mi) closed on March 20, 1987
Sasshō Line
 -  34.9 km (21.7 mi) closed on June 19, 1972

References

External links 

 JR Hokkaido - Official site 
 JR Hokkaido - Official site 
  Wiki collection of bibliographic works on Hokkaido Railway Company

 
Railway companies established in 1987
Companies based in Sapporo
Japanese companies established in 1987